Jiangxi Air Co., Ltd. is a Chinese low-cost carrier with its headquarters at Nanchang Changbei International Airport, Jiangxi. It is a joint venture between XiamenAir and the Jiangxi Provincial Government. The airline flies to six destinations using Boeing 737-800 aircraft.

History 
On 13 August 2014, XiamenAir and the Jiangxi Provincial Government signed a memorandum of understanding regarding the establishment of an airline based in the province.

On 17 March 2015, the Civil Aviation Administration of China (CAAC) granted Jiangxi Air preliminary approval to begin operations. The airline was granted its air operator's certificate on 8 December.

On 14 December 2015, Jiangxi Air received its first Boeing 737-800 aircraft, from parent XiamenAir, while unveiling its logo. Its livery consists of a crane, symbolising the environmental beauty of Jiangxi Province; and the colours blue and white, representing the famous porcelain of Jingdezhen in the province.

On 30 December 2015, the airline conducted its first test flight, from Nanchang to Xiamen. It received its air operator's certificate on 8 January 2016, allowing it to commence commercial flights.

Jiangxi Air operated its first flight on 29 January 2016, from Nanchang to Ürümqi via Xi'an. It is initially using pilots, flight attendants, maintenance staff, and other staff from XiamenAir.

Corporate affairs 
Jiangxi Air is a joint venture between XiamenAir (60%) and state-owned Jiangxi Aviation Investment Co Ltd (40%). The two organisations have invested ¥2 billion in the airline.

Destinations 
As of April 2019, Jiangxi Air flies to the following destinations in China:

Fleet 

, Jiangxi Air operates the following aircraft:

References

External links 
 —

Airlines of China
XiamenAir
Transport in Jiangxi
Companies based in Jiangxi
Government-owned companies of China
Airlines established in 2014
Chinese companies established in 2014
China Southern Airlines
Chinese brands
Low-cost carriers